William Hickin Jackson (1894 – 3 May 1917) was an English professional footballer who played as a centre forward in the Football League for West Bromwich Albion.

Personal life 
Jackson served in the Officer Training Corps during the First World War and was commissioned as a second lieutenant in the West Yorkshire Regiment on 22 January 1916, a year-and-a-half after the beginning of the war. He was killed in France on 3 May 1917 and is commemorated on the Arras Memorial.

Career statistics

References

1894 births
1917 deaths
Military personnel from Birmingham, West Midlands
People from Oldbury, West Midlands
English footballers
Association football forwards
Oldbury Town F.C. players
West Bromwich Albion F.C. players
English Football League players
British Army personnel of World War I
West Yorkshire Regiment officers
British military personnel killed in World War I
Officers' Training Corps officers